Rowland Robert Teape Davis (c.1807–27 February 1879) was a New Zealand labour reformer, hotel-keeper and politician. He was born in Bantry Bay, County Cork, Ireland on c.1807.

References

1800s births
1879 deaths
Irish emigrants to New Zealand (before 1923)
New Zealand activists
New Zealand hoteliers
Politicians from County Cork
19th-century New Zealand politicians